In cricket, a five-wicket haul (also known as a "five–for" or "fifer") refers to a bowler taking five or more wickets in a single innings. This is regarded as a notable achievement, and fewer than 40 bowlers have taken more than 15 five-wicket hauls at international level in their cricketing careers.
Anil Kumble is a former Test and One Day International (ODI) cricketer who represented India. He is a right-arm leg spin (legbreak googly) bowler. Kumble has taken 619 wickets in Test cricket and 337 wickets in ODI cricket. With 37 five-wicket hauls, Kumble has the highest number of Test and combined international five-wicket hauls among Indian cricketers and fourth highest among all players, after Muttiah Muralitharan, Richard Hadlee, and Shane Warne.

Kumble made his ODI debut against Sri Lanka and his Test debut against England, both in 1990. His first five-wicket haul was against South Africa at Johannesburg (November, 1992) in the second Test of India's tour. He has claimed the most of his five-wicket hauls against Australia, ten of them, all in Test matches. His best performance was against Pakistan at the Feroz Shah Kotla in 1999; Kumble took all ten wickets during the second innings, just the second person to do so, after Jim Laker, and in the process ensured India of their first Test victory against Pakistan in twenty years. The feat also ranks as the second best bowling figures in Test history. Twenty of Kumble's Test cricket five-wicket hauls have come in victory for India, while five have been in defeats. Kumble has also taken two five-wicket hauls in ODIs. His first ODI five-wicket haul was against the West Indies during the final of the 1993 Hero Cup when he took six wickets for twelve runs, a record for India in One Day Internationals. The performance ensured India's victory and Kumble was adjudged man of the match. His other ODI five-wicket haul was against New Zealand at the Basin Reserve in 1994.

Key

Tests

One Day Internationals

Notes

References

Indian cricket lists
Kumble, Anil